Patsha Bay is a Congolese actor and singer notable for Viva Riva! (2010) and Of Sentimental Value (2016).

Career 
Patasha Bay played a leading role in the critically acclaimed Viva Riva!, directed by Djo Tunda wa Munga in 2010, which received 12 nominations and won 6 awards at the 7th Africa Movie Academy Awards. He was also nominated for the Best Actor in a Leading Role award for his performance in the film.

He appeared in the film Of Sentimental Value in the year 2016.

Filmography 

 Viva Riva! - 2010
 Of Sentimental Value - 2016

References

External links 
 

Year of birth missing (living people)
Living people
Democratic Republic of the Congo actors
21st-century Democratic Republic of the Congo male singers